Francisco Manuel Delorenzi (born 3 January 1998) is an Argentine professional footballer who plays as a centre-back for Argentine Primera Nacional club Club Almagro.

Career
Delorenzi, after coming through the youth ranks of Jorge Newbery Luján and Flandria, joined Independiente's ranks in 2012. In January 2019, Delorenzi departed on loan to join Categoría Primera A's Deportivo Cali. He made his bow in senior football on 7 March during a 0–3 win against Patriotas, he had previously been an unused substitute for fixtures with Deportes Tolima, Unión Magdalena and Independiente Medellín. In the succeeding May, Delorenzi appeared in continental competition for the first time after featuring in matches with Guaraní and Peñarol in the Copa Sudamericana.

On 29 July 2020, it was announced that Delorenzi had joined Salamanca but a day later all articles relating to the transfer on the club's official site were removed. He was eventually unveiled again on 7 September.

Career statistics
.

References

External links

1998 births
Living people
People from Luján, Buenos Aires
Argentine footballers
Association football defenders
Club Atlético Independiente footballers
Categoría Primera A players
Deportivo Cali footballers
Segunda División B players
Salamanca CF UDS players
Argentine expatriate footballers
Expatriate footballers in Colombia
Expatriate footballers in Spain
Argentine expatriate sportspeople in Colombia
Argentine expatriate sportspeople in Spain
Sportspeople from Buenos Aires Province